Roller skating competitions at the 2007 Pan American Games in Rio de Janeiro was held in July 2007 at the Miécimo da Silva Complex.

Events

Men
Speed

Artistic

Women
Speed

Artistic

Medal table

References

 Results Page

P
Events at the 2007 Pan American Games
2007